The SkyRider X2R  is a flying car design developed by Macro Industries. The SkyRider incorporates tough, lightweight composites for reduced structural weight, it utilizes four-ducted fans with wings to generate lift and maintain flight and uses control systems and onboard computers to generate a travel path to reach a destination given by voice commands.

While still in a prototype phase, the SkyRider is estimated to cost between $500,000 to $1 million, although price is expected to drop to $50,000 if it reaches mass production. In the early 2000s, Macro Industries planned but failed to have an operational prototype by 2005. In 2010, Macro Industries designed and proposed a militarized version of its SkyRider for the DARPA Transformer program. This has not been built as of July 2017

Specifications

General characteristics
Length: 
Width: 
Engines: 1 @ 
Electric drive
Ducted fans: 4
Person capacity: 2 @ 
Load capacity: 
Fuel capacity: 
Range: (50power) 
Conventional takeoff roll: 
VTOL take off roll: 
Noise level: 40 dBA @

Theoretical Performance
Cruise speed: (75power) 
Maximum speed: 
Service ceiling:

References

External links
MACRO Industries, Inc. Website

VTOL aircraft
Ducted fan-powered aircraft